The men's 1500 metres at the 2012 European Athletics Championships was held at the Helsinki Olympic Stadium on 30 June and 1 July.

Medalists

Records

Schedule

Results

Round 1
First 4 in each heat (Q) and 4 best performers (q) advance to the Final.

Final

References

Round 1 Results
Final Results

1500
1500 metres at the European Athletics Championships